The Atlanta Sports Awards was created by the Atlanta Sports Council in 2006 to honor and celebrate the most accomplished athletes, coaches, teams and outstanding contributors in the Atlanta region. Formed as a way to rally the Atlanta sports community and recognize athletic excellence on an annual basis, the awards aim to honor those individuals who distinguish themselves from the five-plus million people who live in the Atlanta area.

The Atlanta Sports Council, a division of the Metro Atlanta Chamber, facilitates the growth and development of sports in metro Atlanta by serving as an event recruiter. The organization plays an important role in improving the quality of life for residents in the region, works to drive economic growth and visibility, and acts as an advocate for the area teams and annual sporting events.

Awards

Categories

The "A" awards are given on behalf of the Atlanta sports community to individuals and teams who have achieved athletic excellence during the calendar year. Category finalists are reflective of a 29-county Atlanta region which includes six professional sports teams, 14 universities, 12 junior colleges and more than 250 public and private high schools.

Coach of the Year: the Atlanta coach whose dedication and commitment to coaching excellence is fostered in the lives of his/her athletes both on and off the field.

Collegiate Athlete of the Year: the Atlanta collegiate athlete who demonstrates superior physical ability in his/her sport.

Community Spirit Award: the Atlanta athlete or coach who is actively involved in the community and epitomizes the highest standards for leadership, sportsmanship and integrity. From 2006 to 2012, recipients of this award were named as the Sports Person of the Year.

High School Athlete of the Year: the Atlanta high school athlete who demonstrates superior physical ability in his/her sport.

Professional Athlete of the Year: the Atlanta professional athlete who demonstrates superior physical ability in his/her sport.

High School Scholar Athletes of the Year: the Atlanta male and female high school student-athlete whose desire to achieve success in sport is equally matched by a desire to achieve success in the classroom.  All finalists are nominated by their school principal and athletic director. Each recipient receives a $1,000 scholarship to be used at an institution of higher education. (This award was given between 2006 – 2013)

Team of the Year: the Atlanta team whose dedication and work ethic resulted in a consistently high level of achievement or a championship.

Winners

The Lifetime Achievement Award
This award recognizes individuals who have made a positive impact on the sports world and Atlanta community throughout their career. (Winner is announced prior to the event)

Furman Bisher Award for Sports Media Excellence
The Atlanta Sports Council honored Furman Bisher in 2000 for his career contributions as an Atlanta Journal-Constitution sports columnist. From that point forward, the Furman Bisher Award for Sports Media Excellence was created to recognize members of Atlanta media for their outstanding coverage of local and regional sports and was awarded to individuals from 2001 to 2010.

Furman Bisher Award winners include:

Amateur Athlete of the Year
The Atlanta Amateur Athlete of the Year awards was awarded from 2006–2010 to area amateur athletes who demonstrated superior physical ability in his/her sport.

Finalists

Coach of the Year: Ron Hunter and Phyllis Arthur (2016), Mike Sansing and Phyllis Arthur (2015), Jack Bauerle and Fredi Gonzalez (2014), Keith Maloof and Mark Richt (2013), Mark Richt and Marynell Meadors(2012).

Team of the Year: GA State Men's Basketball and Roswell HS Football (2016), Buford HS Football and UGA Women's Swimming and Diving (2015), Norcross High School Football and University of Georgia Swimming & Diving (2014), University of Georgia Football and Norcross High School Football (2013), Grayson High School Football and Walton High School Girls' Tennis (2012), Atlanta Dream and Walton High School Girls' Tennis (2011), Atlanta Hawks and UGA Girls' Gymnastics (2010), Buford High School Football and Norcross High School Boys' Basketball (2009), Buford High School Football and Wesleyan High School Volleyball (2008), Peachtree Ridge High School Football and Roswell High School Football (2007), UGA Girls' Gymnastics and UGA Football (2006).

Professional Athlete of the Year: Devonta Freeman and Angel McCoughtry (2016), Paul Millsap and Craig Kimbrel (2015), Angel McCoughtry and Al Horford (2014), Tony Gonzalez and Craig Kimbrel (2013), Al Horford and Brian McCann (2012), Brian McCann and Angel McCoughtry (2011), Melanie Oudin and Brian McCann (2010), Chipper Jones and Michael Turner(2009), Joe Johnson and Chipper Jones (2008), Brian McCann and Joe Johnson (2007), Warrick Dunn and John Smoltz (2006).

Collegiate Athlete of the Year: Andrew Kosic and Ivie Drake (2016), R.J. Hunter and Ollie Schniederjans (2015), Allison Schmitt and Kentavious Caldwell-Pope (2014), Kat Ding and Sasha Goodlett (2013), Mark Pope and Allison Schmitt (2012), Derek Dietrich and Allison Schmitt (2011), Derrick Morgan and Drew Butler (2010), Jonathan Dwyer and Michael Johnson (2009), Tashard Choice and John Isner(2008), Tasha Humphrey and Courtney Kupets (2007), Tasha Humphrey and Jarrett Jack (2006).

Community Spirit Award (Sports Person of the Year from 2006–2012): Brian McCann and Stewart Cink (2011), Darryl Richard and Joe Johnson (2010), Keith Brookings and John Smoltz (2009), Al Horford and Brian Finneran (2008), Tim Hudson and Ilya Kovalchuk (2007), Joe Johnson and Arthur Blank (2006).

High School Athlete of the Year: Lindsey Billings and Candace Hill (2016), Asia Durr and Caitlin Cooper (2015), Lorenzo Carter and Jimmy Yoder (2014), Carl Lawson and Robert Nkemdiche (2013), Shannon Scott and Emily Zabor (2012), Rick Lewis and Timmy Byerly (2011), Hutson Mason and Anne Marie Armstrong (2010), Kathleen Hersey and Derrick Favors (2009), JJ Hickson and Ashley Razey (2008), Eric Berry and Maya Moore (2007), Marcus Ball and Cameron Smith (2006).

Event emcees

References

External links

American awards
Sports in Atlanta